Major General Akbar Khan, DSO (1912–1993) was a decorated officer of the British Indian Army and later Pakistan Army. He commanded the Kashmiri rebels and Pashtun irregulars in the First Kashmir War under the pseudonym 'General Tariq'. In 1951, he was convicted of an attempted coup that came to be known as the Rawalpindi Conspiracy, and served a five-year prison sentence. Later he served as the Chief of National Security under prime minister Zulfikar Ali Bhutto. Under his guidance, the Army quelled the Baloch Insurgency during the early mid-1970s.

Early life and the army
Akbar Khan was born on 1 December 1912, in the village of Utmanzai in the district of Charsadda. He was the son of Muhammad Akram Khan. He belonged to the affluent Pashtun family of the Utmanzais (Parichkhail Family), sub-clan of the larger Kheshgi tribe.

Waziristan War of 1937 and Second World War

He took part in operations in Waziristan war during 1937–1938. During the Second World War he served with the 14th battalion, 13th Frontier Force Rifles, part of 100th Indian Infantry Brigade of the 20th Indian Division during active combat operations against the Imperial Japanese Army in Burma. As a Captain and temporary Major he was awarded the Distinguished Service Order for conspicuous gallantry and leadership displayed during the Battle of Kwanlan Ywathit.

Indo-Pakistan War 1947–1948
At the time of the independence of Pakistan in 1947, Akbar Khan was a member of the sub-committee involved in the division of the armed forces between India and Pakistan.

Akbar Khan's own book Raiders in Kashmir (National Book Foundation, Pakistan, 1975) gives a thorough account of his role in the Pakistani attack on Maharaja Hari Singh's princely state of Jammu and Kashmir. His original role was in arranging guns and devising strategies for the Poonch rebels organised by Sardar Ibrahim with the assistance of the Pakistan Army.  He makes clear he had no involvement in the Pashtun lashkars organised by Khurshid Anwar, which invaded the state on 22 October 1947.

Less than two months after Independence, fighting started in Kashmir, the Indian Army landed in Srinagar and confronted the Pathan tribesmen who were advancing towards the valley. Akbar Khan, who was then a Brigadier, assumed command of the regulars and irregulars fighting against the Indian forces and was given the code name "General Tariq".

The Rawalpindi Conspiracy

Change of heart

It was during this period that he first became dissatisfied with the moral and material support being given to the Pakistani fighters by Liaquat Ali Khan's government. He also had a grudge against General Douglas David Gracey, then Commander-in-Chief of the Pakistan Army, who had put a brake on the deeper involvement of the Pakistani army on the Kashmir front. Akbar Khan was of the opinion – rightly or wrongly – that acceptance of the ceasefire in Kashmir when he was only four hours away from capturing Srinagar was a mistake, and the armed operation against the Indian Army should have been continued.

The constraints under which Akbar Khan had to conduct the battle in Kashmir made him a very frustrated and dissatisfied man. By nature he was extremely brave and, in fact, rather rash. He was also very ambitious. All these qualities and tendencies combined to propel him towards conjuring up a plan to remove the Liaquat government by means of a coup d'état.

The conspiracy begins
In sheer frustration, Akbar Khan started discourses with other armed forces officers to form a group to stage a military coup. The government also became suspicious of his moves. Akbar Khan's wife, Begum Nasim (daughter of the famous Muslim League woman politician Begum Jahanara Shahnawaz), was quite indiscreet in her conversation, criticizing the Government and its policies before all and sundry, as did Akbar Khan himself, to some extent. He thus came under the watch of the intelligence agencies.

Brigadier Akbar was now due for promotion on the basis of his seniority. In December, 1950, he was promoted to Major General and posted as Chief of General Staff in GHQ. In his book Friends, Not Masters, General Ayub Khan wrote that he (Ayub) decided to post Akbar in the GHQ so that, firstly Akbar should not have direct command over troops like a Division Commander, and secondly because he could be kept under close watch by General Ayub Khan himself. Meanwhile, Akbar Khan continued his surreptitious meetings and discussions with various army officers and later with the civilians too.

The Communist Party connection
In those days the Communist Party of Pakistan was under tremendous pressure from Liaquat Ali Khan's government. It was not being allowed to function openly as a political party. Arrest warrants had been issued for all the top leaders of the party — all the members of the party's central committee had gone underground. Ordinary workers and even sympathizers were often arrested, beaten, sent to the fearful Lahore Fort for interrogation and threatened with dire consequences if they did not break all connections with the CP. This was the climate of oppression of the left at that time.

Akbar Khan's wife Nasim had vast connections with political families and political personalities such as Faiz Ahmed Faiz, who was a committed sympathizer of the party. All these political connections brought together the Chief of General Staff and the CP leadership.

Apparently the general had promised the CP leadership that if he came to power he would stop the continuous governmental assault on the leftists; the CP would be allowed to function as a legitimate political party like any other party and to take part in the elections which General Akbar promised to hold a few months after consolidating his power. In return the CP and its affiliated trade unions, kissan (peasant) committees, etc., would welcome the military government. The Pakistan Times, one of the leading newspapers of that period, whose editor was Faiz Ahmed Faiz, would lend editorial support to General Akbar's new dispensation.

The day and co-conspirators
On 23 February 1951, a meeting was held at Major General Akbar Khan's house in which besides a number of military officers, three civilians were also present, namely Faiz Ahmed Faiz, Syed Sajjad Zaheer (General Secretary of the CP) and Mohammed Hussain Ata. In this meeting were also present Lt-Colonel Siddique Raja MC, and Major Mohammed Yousuf Sethi both of whom later obtained state pardon and became approvers in the case against the others. The Chief of General Staff Akbar Khan presented his plan in this meeting which was to arrest the Governor-General Khawaja Nazimuddin and the Prime Minister Liaquat Ali Khan, both of whom were expected to be in Rawalpindi after a week (Karachi being the capital at that time). The Governor-General was to be forced to announce the dismissal of the Liaquat Government and the formation of an interim government presumably under General Akbar Khan. General elections under the army's supervision were also promised but no timeframe was given. The general also spoke about Kashmir, land reforms, eradication of corruption and nepotism and some such other topic.

The probable leak
Among General Akbar's confidants was one Askar Ali Shah, a police officer who was although not present at the meeting of 23 February 1951, had been informed beforehand by the general that he was going to convene such a meeting. This police officer had been a confidant of the general for over two years (or more) and had never leaked out any secret. But this time he got cold feet and blurted out to his IG Police, who in turn informed the Governor NWFP about the meeting. The governor wasted no time in contacting the prime minister.

The conspiracy foiled
The first four persons to be arrested were the Chief of the General Staff Major General Akbar Khan, the Brigade Commander of Quetta, Brigadier M.A. Latif Khan, Faiz Ahmed Faiz and Akbar's wife Nasim. Later some other people were also picked up. But one of the accused, Mohammed Hussain Ata, who was underground eluded arrest for a long time. He was eventually arrested in East Pakistan about a month after the trial proceedings had commenced.

Most of the accused were originally kept in various Lahore jails and later shifted to Hyderabad jail where a special compound inside the jail had been renovated and turned into the court premises. A special tribunal had been formed by the government to hear the case. The tribunal consisted of Justice Sir Abdul Rahman of the federal court, Justice Mohammed Sharif of the Punjab High Court and Justice Amir-ud-Din of the Dacca High Court.

The trial
The trial began on 15 June 1951 at 8.00 a.m. The prosecution was led by the formidable A.K. Brohi - this was one of his earlier cases. Later he was to achieve great fame and notoriety as a legal adviser of dictators and authoritarians. The incomparable Huseyn Shaheed Suhrawardy appeared on behalf of Brigadier Latif and Z.H. Lari on behalf of General Akbar. Other famous practitioners who appeared for the defence were Malik Faiz Mohammed, Khawaja Abdul Rahim, Sahibzada Nawazish Ali and Qazi Aslam. Gradually as the case proceeded and continued month after month, many of the counsel departed due to the inability of their clients to pay them. But credit goes to H.S. Suhrawardy who fought till the very end even when his client had stopped paying him anything more.

The basic charge against all the accused was one of "Conspiracy to wage war against the King". "A careful scrutiny of the first charge" said the judgement, "shows that it relates to a conspiracy alleged by prosecution to have come into being for overthrowing the Government established by law in Pakistan by means of criminal force or show of criminal force." Other allegations, though punishable offences in themselves, were "either the consequences of this conspiracy or merely means to achieve the object for which it was stated to have been entered into." The judgement was, therefore, directed mainly to examine whether the evidence produced by the prosecution was sufficient to establish "(i) the existence of conspiracy ; and if that is found established, (ii) who are proved to have been parties to it?" The evidence led by the prosecution to prove its case was both documentary and oral. The latter was of "persons, who, without being either parties or willing parties to it, either deposed to the existence of the conspiracy or stated facts which might lead a court to draw a conclusion in favour of its existence; and (of) persons who were either, on their own statements, or on account of admissions of facts made by them, or due to existence of other reasonable grounds, held to be willing parties to the conspiracy."

The case as presented by the prosecution, relied basically on the evidence of the two approvers, and other witnesses who gave circumstantial evidence. It was not a false case at all. In general the bulk of the evidence was true. But there was a major falsehood which negated all the claims of the state of presenting a truthful case before the tribunal.

The prosecution induced the approvers to state that at the end of the crucial meeting of 23 February 1951 the people present had agreed to overthrow the government. They had to tell this lie because otherwise the allegation of conspiracy would have fallen flat. According to the penal code a conspiracy is only established 'when two or more persons agree to commit an illegal act or a legal act by illegal means'. If there is no agreement there is no conspiracy under the law.

The Conspirators claimed that after eight long hours of discussion, of arguments and counter-arguments, of high tension and near nervous breakdown, the group of persons assembled in Akbar Khan's house that day had agreed not to take any steps in pursuance of the plan presented by the Chief of General Staff. There was no agreement, and therefore no conspiracy!
General Akbar could have very well been punished under the Army Act for even presenting such a plan and for trying to subvert the loyalty of others.

In jail the military officers and the intellectual civilians managed to get along together reasonably well, in spite of wide differences in ideology and thinking between some individuals. Actually, General Akbar had somehow managed to gather quite a diverse bunch of characters.

There were Major General Nazir Ahmad, who was an Ahmadi; Air Commodore Mohammad Khan Janjua who was Pakistan's first Air Chief; Major Hasan Khan was a Shia; Brigadier Latif was into the Deobandi ideology and read a lot of religious books; Brigadier Sadiq, Lt-Col Ziauddin and Captain Khizar Hayat had faith in pirs and murshids; Lt-Col Niaz Mohammad Arbab was a good-natured person, belonging to an affluent and influential Arbab family of Tekhal Bala, near Peshawar. He was totally uncommitted ideologically, so much so that much later he became a minister in General Muhammad Zia-ul-Haq's government.

Syed Sajjad Zaheer, Mohammed Hussain Ata and Faiz Ahmed Faiz were communists of varying degree. So was Major Ishaq Mohammed, but at that time he was still a beginner. Later, of course, Major Ishaq became a symbol of militant left-wing politics in Pakistan. He was a fearless person and used to argue with vehemence even with the judges of the Tribunal. After an exchange of hot words, Justice Sir Abdul Rahman thundered: "I will set you right", to which Ishaq boldly replied: "Go ahead, my Lord!" The Justice could then only mutter, "I pity you". Ishaq and Ata were both hot-tempered and indulged in blistering polemics when discussing politics in jail.

The two coolest customers in that circle were the senior members of the group, Syed Sajjad Zaheer and Faiz Ahmed Faiz.

Aftermath
Of the fifteen, the only woman, Begum Nasim, was acquitted, while Major General Nazir Ahmad was dismissed from service and sentenced till the rising of the court. All the others received prison sentences ranging from a minimum of four years (civilians and junior officers) to a maximum of 12 years for Major General Akbar Khan.

In the words of the principal accused, Akbar Khan, it was General Ayub Khan (the Army C-in-C) who was the choreographer of this comic strip (conspiracy case) and who apparently had feared that Akbar Khan had about two divisions at his disposal, to support him. His ordeal after his arrest is best described in his own words:

Prime Minister Liaquat Ali Khan himself made the announcement from Lahore about the conspiracy which was generally regarded as treason and the conspiracy came to be known as "The Rawalpindi Conspiracy".

The UK High Commissioner in his 3rd report to his Government on the Rawalpindi Conspiracy ending 17 March 1951 on the question of evidence against the conspirators, stated that "General Akbar Khan was a dangerous man, under the influence of an ambitious wife, and that he had been regarded as very anti-Commonwealth before he went to the United Kingdom last year to attend the Joint Services Staff College. According to Gracey the Defence Secretary Iskander Mirza wished Akbar to go on to the Imperial Defence College to "complete his education". The impression was that on his return, he would be less anti-British, and it was felt that he might be sobered up by being given a responsible job under the eye of the Commander-in-Chief at GHQ. General Gracey also told Colonel Franklin that he had informed the Chief of the Imperial Staff of Akbar's tendencies before he had left for the course... According to an informant... the police have been investigating the activities of Akbar and his wife for the last two years, and General Gracey also maintains that these two, and certain of his friends, had been known as the "Young Turk Party". In spite of all this those in charge were, last December, quite happy to appoint the General to a key post in the Pakistan Army".

Akbar Khan was also one of three generals (the others being Lt. Gen. S.G.M. Pirzada and Tikka Khan) who met with Pakistani President Yahya Khan on 20 February 1971 to plan "Operation Searchlight"; he was appointed Chief of National Security in December, 1971 by Pakistan's new Prime Minister, Zulfikar Ali Bhutto.

Death 
Muhammad Akbar Khan died in 1993 at the age of 81 in Karachi. He was buried in Defense Military graveyard Karachi.

Works 
 Khan, M Akbar (1975). Raiders in Kashmir. National Book Foundation — Islamabad. Second Edition. 210pp

References

Bibliography
Lt Gen Attiqur Rahman (2005). Back to the Pavilion. Oxford University Press. 
Khan, Lt Gen Gul Hassan (1993). Memoirs of Lt Gen Gul Hassan Khan. Oxford University Press. 
Riza, Major Gen Shaukat (1984). The Pakistan Army – War 1965. Services Book Club.
Riza, Major Gen Shaukat (1989). The Pakistan Army 1947–1949. Services Book Club.
Zaheer, Hasan (1998). The Times and Trial of The Rawalpindi Conspiracy 1951. Oxford University Press.

Further reading
 
 
 
 
 
 
 

British Indian Army officers
Pakistani generals
Graduates of the Royal Military College, Sandhurst
Companions of the Distinguished Service Order
Anti-communism in Pakistan
1912 births
1993 deaths
People of the Indo-Pakistani War of 1947
People of the 1947 Kashmir conflict